Cercospora rhapidicola is a fungal plant pathogen.

References

rhapidicola
Fungal plant pathogens and diseases